The 2017–18 Maltese Division 1 season, is the premier men's basketball competition in Malta.
BUPA Luxol are the defending champions.

Competition format
Five teams joined the regular season and competed in a double-legged round-robin tournament. The four best qualified teams of the regular season joined the playoffs.

Regular season

League table

Playoffs
Playoffs started on 25 April 2018 and ended on 16 May 2018. The semifinals were played in a best-of-three-games format, while the finals in a best-of-five one.

References

External links
Eurobasket.com

Moldovan
Basketball in Malta